Sree Narayana Guru is a 1986 Indian Malayalam film, directed by P. A. Backer and produced by Kollam Jaffer. The film stars Kanakalatha, Master Vaisakh and Sree Kumar in the lead roles. The film has musical score by G. Devarajan. It won the Nargis Dutt Award for Best Feature Film on National Integration.

Cast
Kanakalatha as Narayanan's mother
Master Vaisakh
Sree Kumar
Vijayakumari as Narayanan's sister
Karakulam Chandran as Narayanan's father

Soundtrack
The music was composed by G. Devarajan and the lyrics were written by Kumaranasan, Sreenarayana Guru, Kollam Jaffer and S. Ramesan Nair.

References

External links
 

1986 films
1980s Malayalam-language films
Films directed by P. A. Backer
Indian biographical films
Best Film on National Integration National Film Award winners
1980s biographical films